is a former Japanese football player.

Playing career
Mori was born in Nagasaki Prefecture on May 5, 1972. He played for Nagoya Grampus Eight. He played many matches as center back from 1994. The club won the champions 1995 Emperor's Cup first major title in club history. In 1996, he moved to Japan Football League (JFL) club Vissel Kobe. The club won the 2nd place in 1996 and was promoted to J1 League. In 1998, he moved to JFL club Omiya Ardija and retired end of 1998 season.

Club statistics

References

External links

1972 births
Living people
Association football people from Nagasaki Prefecture
Japanese footballers
J1 League players
Japan Football League (1992–1998) players
Nagoya Grampus players
Vissel Kobe players
Omiya Ardija players
Association football defenders